Yash Narvekar is an Indian playback singer, composer and lyricist who has written and sung "Mere Dil Mein" in the film Half Girlfriend, "Teri Yaadon Mein" in Behen Hogi Teri, and  "Gulabi 2.0" in Noor among a number of popular songs.

Career
Yash was given a break by Mohit Suri from EMI Records India, where he was trained. Yash is a frequent collaborator with music producer Rishi Rich. He was a participant in The Remix on Amazon Prime Video.

Discography

As lyricist

As playback singer

Other songs as vocalist

References

Indian male songwriters
Indian lyricists
Bollywood playback singers
Indian male playback singers
Indian film score composers
Living people
Indian male film score composers
Year of birth missing (living people)